Emblemariopsis bottomei, the Shorthead blenny or the Midnight blenny, is a species of chaenopsid blenny found in coral reefs in the western central Atlantic ocean. It can reach a maximum length of  SL. The specific name honours Peter Bottome, although who this is, is not specified but it may possibly be the Venezuelan businessman Peter Bottome Deery (1937-2016).

References
 Stephens, J.S., Jr., 1961 (10 Nov.) A description of a new genus and two new species of chaenopsid blennies from the western Atlantic. Notulae Naturae (Philadelphia) No. 349: 1–8.

bottomei
Taxa named by John S. Stephens Jr.
Fish described in 1961